The Mitsubishi Carisma was a large family car produced for the European market by Mitsubishi Motors from 1995 to 2004.

The model name was derived from a combination of the English car and the Greek kharisma, meaning "divine gift". It was co-developed with Volvo, sharing its chassis with the first generation of the Volvo S40, and built at the NedCar factory in Born, Netherlands, which the two companies co-owned at the time. Over 350,000 were built during its production run. Volume production begun in May 1995 with sales starting in Holland in June. The four-door saloon sales started the following year.

Development
Available as a four door saloon or a five door hatchback style only, it featured inline four petrol engines from 1.3 L (introduced later in life) to 1.8 L, 1.8 L direct injection petrol engine from 1998, and  1.9 L turbo-diesel powerplants sourced from Renault, later with the  1.9 DI-D common rail diesel engine, the same as used in both Volvo and Renault cars. Mitsubishi claimed the 1.8 GDI engine offered a 20% saving in fuel consumption, 10% increase in power and 20% decrease in greenhouse gases when compared to a conventional 1.8 petrol engine.

The Carisma had a fairly neutral design as a result of being Mitsubishi's first attempt to target the traditionally conservative European company car market, where it competed with the likes of the Ford Mondeo. 

The Carisma was facelifted in 1999, with the new models being launched in the UK on the 1st of August. This included a new front end, interior, boot lid and rear lights. It also featured ABS as standard, a wider front track and uprated suspension. The car underwent a very light redesign again in 2002, with the main difference being new tinted headlights, new alloy wheel designs and black front grilles, instead of chrome. The car was placed between the Lancer and the Galant, although after production ended in December 2004, the Lancer took its place in Mitsubishi's European range.

In several markets where the Lancer was not available, the Evolution version was rebadged as the Mitsubishi Carisma GT. In Japan, the Carisma was sold at a specific retail chain called Car Plaza. It was only available for 1996 and 1997 as a 1.8 saloon, with trim levels being L, LX and LS. The chassis was also used by Proton to develop the Proton Waja.

Production and sales

(Sources: Fact & Figures 2000, Fact & Figures 2005, Mitsubishi Motors website)

Gallery

Engines

References

Carisma
Euro NCAP large family cars
Cars of the Netherlands
Cars introduced in 1995
2000s cars
VDL Nedcar vehicles
Touring cars